The Palmer Fire was a wildfire in Beaumont, California in the United States. The fire was reported on September 2, 2017, and was 100% contained by September 6 at 11:53 AM. The cause of the fire was fireworks.

The fire

The Palmer Fire was reported on September 2, 2017, at 1:33 PM, in Beaumont, California near San Timoteo Canyon Road and Fisherman's Retreat. Upon arrival, the fire was burning . Approximately one hour later, the fire was burning  and at 3:30 pm evacuation orders were in place for Oak Canyon Road between San Timoteo Canyon Road and Interstate 10. By the end of the day, the fire had  and was 10% contained. Redlands Boulevard, south of San Timoteo Canyon Road, was closed and evacuation centers were opened in Redlands and Yucaipa. Approximately 450 people were evacuated from their homes. 

By morning on September 3, the fire had spread  and was 15% contained and evacuations were removed. By the end of the day,  were burning and 35% was contained. On September 6, the fire was 100% contained, after burning . The cause of the fire was fireworks. 300 fire personnel fought the fire.

See also
2017 California wildfires

References

2017 California wildfires
Wildfires in Riverside County, California